Nicky's Game is an American short film, originally developed and produced as an independent television pilot, based on Peter Alson's New York Times Best Seller Confessions of an Ivy League Bookie. The film was shot on 16mm in New York City and was premiered in 2005 at the inaugural New York Television Festival. It went on to become an official selection of the 2006 Vail Film Festival and CineVegas International Film Festival before being released on DVD and other media by IndiePix Films.

Plot summary
Nicky Singer (John Ventimiglia) is a down on his luck Brooklyn native who has parlayed his Yale education into a job eking out a living as a professional poker player. Using his wits to navigate the seedy world of underground poker, he must balance his own interests with those of his father (Burt Young), a retiree whose own gambling debts have pushed him to the brink of eviction. In a struggle to keep his head above water, Nicky encounters a diverse group of wannabe mobsters, thugs and other eccentric characters.

References

External links

American independent films
Films set in New York City
2005 drama films
2005 short films
2005 films
American drama films
2000s English-language films
2000s American films